A by-election was held for the New South Wales Legislative Assembly electorate of Campbelltown on 3 February 2001 because of the resignation of Michael Knight.

The  party did not field a candidate.

Results

Michael Knight resigned.

See also
Electoral results for the district of Campbelltown
List of New South Wales state by-elections

References 

2001 elections in Australia
New South Wales state by-elections
2000s in New South Wales
February 2001 events in Australia